Aleksandar Ćapin (born October 6, 1982) is a Serbian former professional basketball player.

Early life
Growing up in Sarajevo, Ćapin took up association football in the FK Sarajevo youth system.

In spring 1992, with the outbreak of the Bosnian War, he fled the city to Belgrade along with his sister while their parents joined them several months later. In Belgrade, young Ćapin continued pursuing football within the FK Rad youth system.

In 1993, disappointed with being demoted to FK Rad's second team, the youngster switched to basketball by starting to attend KK Partizan-organized training sessions administered by the youth coach Dragiša Stamenković at the France Prešern Elementary School in the Belgrade neighbourhood of Miljakovac. Deemed talented enough, Ćapin was attached to KK Partizan's youth system where he was coached by Stamenković for a few seasons before progressing up the age groups within the system and being coached by Igor Kokoškov, Milovan "Kime" Bogojević, Aleksandar Bućan, and Nenad Trajković.

Among the fellow prospects Ćapin shared rosters with at Partizan youth system were Marko Peković, Vule Avdalović, Aleksandar Gajić, and Mirko Kovač.

Professional career

KK Krka
After playing in the juniors of Partizan, Ćapin would end up starting his senior career with Krka in the 2000–01 season. He arrived at the club via attending a club-organized summer junior camp where Krka wanted to identify and potentially sign new payers. Though having another year left as a junior at KK Partizan, the 17-year-old was not keen on playing at KK Torlak, which the Partizan management signed a deal with regarding loaning out its juniors to, and decided to attend Krka's camp in Slovenia where he was offered a contract. Registered both with Krka's junior team and full squad, 18-year-old Ćapin mostly spent the season playing the Slovenian third-tier league with the club's juniors while also getting occasional minutes with the full squad under head coach Aleš Pipan that played the Slovenian League and FIBA SuproLeague though Capin was ineligible for the domestic league due to administrative issues. In his debut season as a professional, Ćapin saw some playing time in SuproLeague as the third option at the point-guard position behind Simon Petrov and Dražen Anzulović on a squad that also featured shooting guard / small forward Saša Dončić, center Bennett Davison, veteran center Franjo Arapović, and power forward Dragiša Drobnjak.

After three years in Slovenia, Ćapin played for the German team Telekom Bonn in the 2003–04 season. Between 2004 and 2008, Ćapin played for Gravelines-Dunkerque in France, for Panellinios and Panionios in Greece, and for Viola Reggio Calabria and Cimberio Varese in Italy.

In the summer of 2008, Ćapin signed a one-year contract with Azovmash from Ukraine. However, he got injured during a preseason game in September 2008, and he was released from the club without making a competitive debut. In February 2009, he signed for the Russian team Lokomotiv Rostov, and he also stayed with the club after their relocating to Krasnodar.

After spending a year in Russia, Ćapin moved to Lithuania and signed with Žalgiris in January 2010. Ćapin returned to Slovenia in the 2011–12 season and played for Union Olimpija.  In December 2011, Ćapin moved to Turkey and joined Türk Telekom.

On October 10, 2012, Ćapin signed for the Serbian team Radnički Kragujevac. He showed great performances during the season and helped the team to reach the Adriatic League Final four. Ćapin also led the league in scoring and assists, and he earned the Adriatic League MVP award.

On August 9, 2013, Ćapin signed with Budućnost Podgorica. On December 10, 2014, he parted ways with Budućnost. Nine days later, he signed with Juvecaserta Basket of Italy. On March 5, 2015,  he left Caserta and signed with the Macedonian club MZT Skopje for the rest of the season.

On August 12, 2015, he signed a one-year deal with Igokea. He debuted for the team in 67–56 loss to Cedevita in Round 1 of the ABA League; he led his team with 15 points, 5 assists and 2 rebounds. On January 5, 2016, he parted ways with Igokea. On February 5, 2016, he signed with Koroivos for the rest of the 2015–16 Greek Basket League season.

On January 13, 2017, he signed with Slovenian club Primorska for the rest of the season.

On August 15, 2017, he signed with Serbian club Dynamic Belgrade. On December 30, 2017, he parted ways with Dynamic.

National team career
Ćapin played with the senior Slovenian national team at the 2005 EuroBasket and the 2007 EuroBasket.

Career statistics

EuroLeague

|-
| style="text-align:left;"| 2001–02
| style="text-align:left;"| Krka
| 12 || 1 || 9.3 || .500 || .111 || .500 || 0.5 || 0.8 || 0.3 || 0.0 || 1.9 || 1.2
|-
| style="text-align:left;"| 2009–10
| style="text-align:left;"| Žalgiris
| 7 || 0 || 18.9 || .283 || .240 || .692 || 3.3 || 2.4 || 0.6 || 0.0 || 6.4 || 4.0
|-
| style="text-align:left;"| 2010–11
| style="text-align:left;"| Žalgiris
| 5 || 1 || 8.6 || .545 || .500 || .1000 || 1.8 || 1.2 || 0.2 || 0.0 || 3.4 || 5.4
|-
| style="text-align:left;"| 2011–12
| style="text-align:left;"| Union Olimpija
| 8 || 7 || 23.0 || .360 || .321 || .857 || 1.0 || 2.9 || 0.8 || 0.0 || 7.1 || 7.6
|- class="sortbottom"
| style="text-align:left;"| Career
| style="text-align:left;"|
| 32 || 9 || 14.7 || .365 || .266 || .771 || 1.4 || 1.7 || 0.4 || 0.0 || 4.4 || 13.1

References

External links
 Aleksandar Ćapin at aba-liga.com
 Aleksandar Ćapin at euroleague.net
 Aleksandar Ćapin at fiba.com
 Aleksandar Ćapin at legabasket.it
 Aleksandar Ćapin at tblstat.net
 Aleksandar Ćapin at eurobasket.com

1982 births
Living people
ABA League players
Basketball League of Serbia players
Bosnia and Herzegovina expatriate basketball people in Serbia
BC Azovmash players
BCM Gravelines players
BC Žalgiris players
Juvecaserta Basket players
KK Budućnost players
KK Dynamic players
KK Igokea players
KK Krka players
KK MZT Skopje players
KK Olimpija players
KK Radnički Kragujevac (2009–2014) players
Koroivos B.C. players
Pallacanestro Varese players
Panellinios B.C. players
Panionios B.C. players
PBC Lokomotiv-Kuban players
Point guards
Serbs of Bosnia and Herzegovina
Slovenian expatriate basketball people in France
Slovenian expatriate basketball people in Germany
Slovenian expatriate basketball people in Greece
Slovenian expatriate basketball people in Italy
Slovenian expatriate basketball people in Lithuania
Slovenian expatriate basketball people in Russia
Slovenian expatriate basketball people in Serbia
Slovenian expatriate basketball people in Turkey
Slovenian men's basketball players
Slovenian people of Serbian descent
Basketball players from Sarajevo
Telekom Baskets Bonn players
Türk Telekom B.K. players
Viola Reggio Calabria players